Phoolwari is a 1946 Indian Hindi-language romantic drama film directed by Chaturbhuj Doshi for Ranjit Studios. The film starred Motilal and Khursheed in lead roles, with Madhubala and Dixit appearing in supporting roles. Its music was composed by Hansraj Behl, while the lyricist was Pandit Indra.

Phoolwari, a critical and commercial success, is cited to be one of the most successful and important films of Motilal. It is considered lost today.

Cast 
 Motilal
 Khursheed
 Madhubala
 Dixit
 Nazira
 Tiwari

Production 
Phoolwari began filming in October 1945 and was completed by February 1946. It was Madhubala's fourth film under Ranjit Movietone and overall fifth film as a child artist.

Soundtrack 
The film's music was composed by Hansraj Behl with lyrics by Pandit Indra. The singers included Khursheed, Baby Anu, Mohantara Talpade, and Hamida Banu.

Songlist

Box office 
Phoolwari was a critical and commercial success. Box office India reported that the film grossed 40 lakhs at the box office to emerge as the third highest-grossing film of 1946, with a verdict of "hit".

References

External links
 

1946 films
1940s Hindi-language films
Indian black-and-white films
Films directed by Chaturbhuj Doshi
Lost Indian films
1940s lost films
Lost romantic drama films